Color in Your Life is the third studio album by American new wave band Missing Persons, released in 1986. It was the band's last studio album with the original line-up, with the sole exception of Chuck Wild, who left the group in 1985 and was not replaced.

Track listing
All songs by Missing Persons (Dale Bozzio, Terry Bozzio, Warren Cuccurullo, and Patrick O'Hearn), except where noted.

"Color in Your Life" – 5:00
"I Can't Think About Dancin'" – 5:16
"No Secrets" – 4:29
"Flash of Love" – 4:15
"Go Against the Flow" – 5:54
"Boy I Say to You" – 4:38
"Come Back for More" – 3:41
"Face to Face" – 3:33
"We Don't Know Love at All" – 5:02

CD Bonus Tracks'
"Hot to Cold" [*] (D. Bozzio, T. Bozzio, W. Cuccurullo) – 3:40
"It's a Must" [*] (D. Bozzio, T. Bozzio, Cuccurullo) – 4:34
"Words" [Live 1981] (T. Bozzio, Cuccurullo) – 4:23
"Destination Unknown" [Live 1981] (D. Bozzio, T. Bozzio, Cuccurullo) – 3:20
"Mental Hopscotch" [Live 1981] (T. Bozzio, Cuccurullo) – 3:04
"Hello, I Love You" [Live 1981] (John Densmore, Robbie Krieger, Ray Manzarek, Jim Morrison) – 2:30

* = previously unreleased

CD Bonus Tracks (2021 Rubellan Remasters edition)
"Hot to Cold" (D. Bozzio, T. Bozzio, W. Cuccurullo)
"It's a Must" (D. Bozzio, T. Bozzio, Cuccurullo)
"I Can't Think About Dancin'" (Single Version)
"I Can't Think About Dancin'" (Extended Version)
"I Can't Think About Dancin'" (Dub Version)

Personnel
Dale Bozzio - vocals
Terry Bozzio - synthesizer, percussion, drums, vocals
Warren Cuccurullo - guitar, vocals
Patrick O'Hearn - synthesizer, bass, vocals

Additional personnel
Carl Carwell - background vocals
Roy Galloway - background vocals
Mark Isham - brass
Robert O'Hearn - synthesizer
Phil Perry - background vocals

Production
Producer: Bernard Edwards
Engineers: Josh Abbey, Sabrina Buchanek, Bill Freesh, Casey McMackin
Assistant engineer: Jon Ingoldsby
Mixing: Michael Barbiero, Victor Deyglio, Bernard Edwards, Steve Thompson
Mastering: Kit Watkins
Programming: Jeff Bova
Overdubs: Mark Isham
Vocal arrangement: Terry Bozzio
Liner notes: Ken Sharp

Charts

Album - Billboard (United States)

References

Missing Persons (band) albums
1986 albums
Albums produced by Bernard Edwards
Capitol Records albums